Ceraurus is a genus of cheirurid trilobite of the middle and, much more rarely, the upper Ordovician. They are commonly found in strata of the lower Great Lakes region. These trilobites have eleven thoracic segments, a very small pygidium and long genal and pygidial spines.

Ceraurus is quite common in the Ordovician of upstate New York, south-central and south-eastern Ontario, and the St. Lawrence Valley in Quebec, as well as in the Canadian Arctic. It and similar genera range in size from less than quarter an inch to well over five inches. Similar genera of trilobites occur in the Ordovician outcrops of the Volkhov River, near St. Petersburg, Russia.

The taxonomy of the genus is problematic, as the many variations of eye placement, decoration patterns of pustules, and spine length call the genus' defining characteristics into question. Ceraurus may, in fact, be at least four genera: Ceraurus sensu stricto, and the genera, Gabriceraurus, Bufoceraurus and Leviceraurus.

References 
 Ludvigsen, Rolf, Fossils of Ontario: Part I: The Trilobites. Toronto: Royal Ontario Museum, 1983.

Cheiruridae
Phacopida genera
Extinct animals of North America
Ordovician trilobites of North America
Middle Ordovician first appearances
Late Ordovician extinctions
Bromide Formation
Paleozoic life of Ontario
Verulam Formation
Paleozoic life of British Columbia
Paleozoic life of the Northwest Territories
Paleozoic life of Nunavut
Paleozoic life of Quebec